Golden Age is an adult animated mockumentary short film which debuted as a web-series on Comedy Central's broadband channel Motherload in 2006. Ten segments trace the sordid careers of oddball cartoon characters from throughout the history of animation. Notable characters include Marching Gumdrop, Lancaster Loon, and Kongobot. The film is produced by Augenblick Studios and directed by Aaron Augenblick. Golden Age was an official selection of the 2007 Sundance Film Festival.

See also 
The Golden Age of American animation

References

External links 
Golden Age Movie
 Augenblick Studios official web site
 "Golden Age Hits the Motherload", Ryan Ball, Animation magazine, May 8, 2006 
 

2006 films
2006 animated films
American adult animated web series
American animated documentary films
American mockumentary films
2000s animated short films
2000s American animated films